Janaesia hibernans is a moth of the family Noctuidae. It is found in the Biobío Region of Chile, the Puno Region of Peru and bordering region in Bolivia as well as Neuquén in Argentina.

The wingspan is about 45 mm. Adults are on wing from January to February.

External links
 Noctuinae of Chile

Noctuinae